Fiifi (or Fifi) Fiavi Kwetey (born 2 June 1967) is a Ghanaian politician and General Secretary of the National Democratic Congress. He is a former 2 term Member of Parliament for the Ketu South constituency in Ghana. He  was Propaganda secretary for the National Democratic Congress (NDC).

Early life and education 
Kwetey was born in Hohoe but comes from Nogokpo both in the Volta Region of Ghana. He attended Bishop Herman College in Kpando in 1987, where he acquired his O level certificate. He further moved to Achimota School for his A level certificate. He holds a Bachelor of Arts in Economics and Psychology from the University of Ghana. In 1994, he obtained the Diplômes de la Chambre de Commerce et d'industrie de Paris (CCIP) (Chamber of Commerce and Industry's Higher Diploma, Paris).

Career 
After the university, Kwetey did his national service with the office of Parliament from October 1993 to July 1994. After the mandatory 1-year national service he moved to work as a Financial Analyst and a stockbroker at the Investment Banking firm, Strategic African Securities Ltd in July 1995. He subsequently moved to CDH Financial Holdings Ltd as a Funds Manager, Investment Analyst and a Stockbroker where he worked from April 1998 to February 2002, whilst also serving as a tutor for some financial Courses at the Ghana Stock Exchange.

Politics 
Whilst in university, Kwetey was as a student leader, serving as the chairman for the National Democratic Congress branch on the University of Legon Campus. In December 2005, Kwetey contested in the national NDC executive elections and won to become the chief communicator for the NDC. Serving as the chief communicator which his party dubbed as the party's Propaganda Secretary, he was seen as the person to criticize the other parties and raise pertinent issues regarding their parties whilst defending his party on the necessary platforms. The position Propaganda Secretary was subsequently rebranded into the National Communications Officer.

Deputy Minister for Finance 
In 2009, Kwetey was appointed by John Atta Mills to serve as deputy Minister for Finance to Kwabena Duffuor who was then Minister for Finance. He was sworn into office in April 2009 after going through vetting in parliament. He worked in that role until January 2013.

Member of Parliament 
In 2012, Kwetey won the Ketu South National Democratic Congress primaries into the 2012 Parliamentary Elections. He won the primaries by getting 403 votes as against 60 votes polled by the then incumbent Albert Ziga, who came third and Raphael Alorwu who polled 82 votes, whiles Nyphson Agbagedy also got 30 votes. Kwetey subsequently won the Ketu South parliamentary elections by getting 77,837 votes which represented 88.92% of the votes cast against his closest contender Godwin Yayra Nkuawu of the New Ptriotic party who got 4,122 votes representing 4.71%.

In 2015, Fiifi Kwetey was maintained as the National Democratic Congress candidate for the Ketu South constituency going into the 2016 parliamentary elections. He won the primaries by polling 146,10 votes representing 86.13% to beat Sylvanus Amedorme who garnered 1,375 votes and Famous Kuadugah, 637 votes at Denu in the Volta Region.

He was elected in the 2016 Elections to serve as member of parliament for Ketu South for another term in the parliament of Ghana after getting 48,723 votes representing 65.47% of the total votes against his closest contender Jim Yao Morti an independent candidate who got 18,643 votes representing 25.04%. Jim Yao Morti was a former member of the NDC who had been disqualified during the vetting process and suspended subsequently by the NDC and was contesting as an independent candidate.

Minister of State 
Kwetey was appointed by President John Dramani Mahama to serve as Minister of State at the Presidency in charge of Financial and Allied Institutions in February 2013. His role was to work hand in hand with the finance ministry through the office of the president to monitor and regulate the financial and allied institutions. Serving that capacity he inaugurated a five-member steering committee for the National Pension Regulatory Authority (NPRA) to oversee the implementation of a three-year capacity building agreement with the Swiss Government. The Swiss government had granted the Ghanaian Government an amount of 2.4million to support the Authority to build up their human capacity, establish a better functional organizational structure to help them perform their role as the regulator that ensures the pension scheme and system protects and truly promotes the interest of the pensioners in Ghana.

Minister of Food and Agriculture 
He served in this role until he was reassigned to serve as Minister of Food and Agriculture to replace Clement Kofi Humado. His role as a finance person was to ensure the Ghanaian Agricultural sector would see a rise in production and the reduction in importation of good and rise in exportation. His vision was to push the agricultural ministry into an agribusiness oriented rather than just food production oriented agriculture sector.

He was later moved to Minister for Transport after Mrs. Dzifa Ativor resigned after issues regarding the controversial GHS 3.6m bus re-branding contract

Personal life 
He is married to Naomi Kwetey and together they have 4 children.

Anti-Muslim comment

In his capacity as propaganda secretary of the NDC and adviser to former President Rawlings, Fiifi Kwetey in 2007 stated during an interaction with US embassy officials that "in no uncertain terms that a Muslim can never become the President of the Republic of Ghana". He went ahead to say that "While most Ghanaians would not admit this openly, a Muslim could not be elected President of Ghana". Brought to light following the mass leakage of US diplomatic cables in 2010, his comments provoked anger among Ghanaian Muslims who have demanded that he retract his statements and apologize. As of March 2015, he has yet to take back his words and render an apology to the Muslim community.

See also
NDC politicians
 Ketu South Constituency

References 

1967 births
Living people
National Democratic Congress (Ghana) politicians
Agriculture ministers of Ghana
Government ministers of Ghana
Ewe people
Ghanaian MPs 2013–2017
Ghanaian MPs 2017–2021
Bishop Herman College alumni